Events in the year 1842 in Norway.

Incumbents
Monarch: Charles III John

Events
 Porsgrunn was granted full city status. Limited city status was granted in 1807.
 Flekkefjord was granted full city status.
 Lillehammer was granted full city status.
 The Norwegian Missionary Society was founded in Stavanger.
 The eleventh Storting convened, following the 1841 election.
 The Conventicle Act was repealed.
 The Witchcraft Act (Trolldomslov) is abolished.

Arts and literature
 Ivar Aasen commenced his research on rural dialects all across Norway

Births

January to June

16 March – Theodor Nilsen Stousland, politician (d.1910).
1 April – Edmund Neupert, pianist and composer (d.1888)
12 June – Rikard Nordraak, composer (d.1866)
26 May – Evald Rygh, banker, politician and Minister (d.1913)

July to December

6 August – Karl Gether Bomhoff, pharmacist, politician and Governor of the Central Bank of Norway (d. 1925).
31 August – Ole Bornemann Bull, ophthalmologist (d.1916)
2 December – Robert Collett, zoologist (d.1913)
16 December – Otto Sinding, painter (d.1909)
17 December – Sophus Lie, mathematician (d.1899).

Full date unknown
Nils S. Dvergsdal, politician (d.1921)

Deaths
16 March – Maurits Hansen, writer (b.1794)

Full date unknown
Henrik Anker Bjerregaard, poet, dramatist and judge (b.1792)
Wilhelm Jürgensen, military officer (b.1762)

See also

References